Ranfurly may refer to the following places:

Ranfurly, Alberta, Canada
Ranfurly, Renfrewshire, Renfrewshire, Scotland
Ranfurly, New Zealand, Otago, New Zealand

Ranfurly may also refer to:
 Ranfurly Shield, one of New Zealand's most important trophies in the sport of Rugby Union
Uchter Knox, 5th Earl of Ranfurly, a Governor-General of New Zealand